Isla Isabel National Park is a national park and protected area located in Nayarit, Mexico. The park was established in 1980 and is approximately 1.94 square kilometers.

References

National parks of Mexico
Ramsar sites in Mexico
Protected areas of Nayarit